
Baslerweiher (literally "Pond of Basel") is an artificial pond in Seewen, Canton of Solothurn, Switzerland. Its dam was built in 1870 to supply water to Basel.

External links

Baslerweiher Seewen Tourism information 

Lakes of the canton of Solothurn
Reservoirs in Switzerland
Dams completed in 1870